Ouyang Kunpeng (born November 19, 1982, in Jiangxi) is a Chinese swimmer and China's top male backstroker, holding the Chinese record in the long course and short course 50m, 100m, and 200m backstroke.

In May 2008, he was banned for life from the sport for a positive anti-doping test. In July 2008, FINA announced his lifetime ban by the Chinese Swimming Association with a posting on their anti-doping website. As of December 2010, this posting has been updated with a change of the ban from lifetime to 2-years.

In December 2010, an AP report surfaced which indicated that his lifetime ban had been converted to a more-conventional 2-year ban; however, Ouyang was experience difficulties in return to competition in China, where the lifetime ban originated and was still in place.

Personal bests
In long course
 50m backstroke: 25.18 (December 4, 2005)
 100m backstroke: 54.41 (December 5, 2005)

References

External links
 Profile - sports.sina.com.cn

1982 births
Living people
Chinese male backstroke swimmers
Swimmers from Jiangxi
Olympic swimmers of China
Chinese sportspeople in doping cases
Doping cases in swimming
Swimmers at the 2000 Summer Olympics
Swimmers at the 2004 Summer Olympics
Asian Games medalists in swimming
Swimmers at the 2002 Asian Games
Swimmers at the 2006 Asian Games
Asian Games silver medalists for China
Asian Games bronze medalists for China
Medalists at the 2002 Asian Games
Medalists at the 2006 Asian Games
Universiade medalists in swimming
Universiade gold medalists for China
Medalists at the 2003 Summer Universiade